Paweł Lisiecki (born 15 August 1978) is a Polish politician, member of the Sejm and member of the Law and Justice political party.  He represents the Warsaw I constituency. 

From 2002 to 2014 he was a councilman of Praga Północ, and from 2014 to 2016 mayor of the district. In 2015 he was elected to the Sejm, reelected in 2019.

References 

Living people
1978 births
Law and Justice politicians
Members of the Polish Sejm 2015–2019
Members of the Polish Sejm 2019–2023
Politicians from Warsaw
University of Warsaw alumni